The Tunxis Forest Ski Cabin is a historic ski lodge at the end of Balance Rock Road in Tunxis State Forest, Hartland, Connecticut.  Built in 1937, it is one of the few surviving ski-related recreational structures built by the Civilian Conservation Corps in the state.  It was listed on the National Register of Historic Places in 1986.

Description and history

The Tunxis Forest Ski Cabin is located in the eastern unit of Tunxis State Forest, a short hike off the western end of Balance Rock Road.  It is a single-story log structure, with a gabled roof and massive fieldstone chimney.  Its logs are laid with dovetailed corners, each level slightly smaller than that below it.  The front facade is three bays wide, with an entrance flanked by paired square windows.  The side walls each have two square windows set in individual openings.  The roof is built with an extended overhang, its trusses exposed both outside and inside.

The cabin was built as the base lodge of a ski area that the CCC crews of nearby Camp Robinson built in 1937.  As part of this work the CCC also built Balance Rock Road, where culverts and retaining walls also still survive.  The CCC also built a ski area in Mohawk State Forest, of which nothing survives.  This cabin is the only substantial surviving element of the Tunxis ski area, which has become reforested.  It is believed to be one of the oldest surviving artifacts related to downhill skiing in the state.

See also
National Register of Historic Places listings in Hartford County, Connecticut

References

Log buildings and structures on the National Register of Historic Places in Connecticut
National Register of Historic Places in Hartford County, Connecticut
Buildings and structures completed in 1937
Buildings and structures in Hartford County, Connecticut
Hartland, Connecticut